Christine A. Palm (born January 12, 1956) is an American politician who serves in the Connecticut House of Representatives representing the 36th district in Middlesex County.

Political career

Election
Palm was elected in the general election on November 6, 2018, winning 50.82% of the vote over 49.18% of Republican candidate Robert Siegrist.

References

 Connecticut Democrats
Palm, Christine 
Living people
21st-century American politicians
21st-century American women politicians
Women state legislators in Connecticut
1956 births